The Ducati Diavel is the second cruiser motorcycle from Ducati after the Indiana of 1986–1990. The 2011 model year Diavel debuted in November 2010 at the EICMA motorcycle show in Milan. The second generation Diavel debuted as a 2015 model on 3 March 2014 during the Volkswagen Group Night in Geneva.

The engine is a retuned version of the   Testastretta from the 1198 superbike, now called the Testastretta 11° for its 11° valve overlap (reduced from 41°).

Styling for the Diavel was developed in-house, although the project began under the leadership of Ducati's previous design chief, Pierre Terblanche, who commissioned Glynn Kerr, freelance designer and design columnist for Motorcycle Consumer News, to produce the initial concept sketches. In the US, most Diavel buyers appear to be existing riders age 50 and over, with more women than usual attracted to the bike, and some Harley-Davidson owners, especially V-Rod riders, trading for the new Ducati power cruiser.

For 2017 Ducati released the Ducati Diavel Diesel with a limited production of 666 bikes. The bike is a collaboration of Ducati and Diesel, a premium denim retail and fashion brand. Cycle World commented that it has an appearance of "a Mad Max-inspired retro-futuristic theme...". They also stated that the Diavel is "owner of the quickest 0–60 mph time of any production motorcycle Cycle World has ever tested".

Revisions

Gen 1 

The gen 1 is the original design, featuring a round headlight with LED DRL down the center in a horizontal line. It came in two main non-limited variants, the dark, which was the standard model, and the carbon, which featured Marchesini wheels, a carbon front mud guard, carbon tank and seat cowling, and coated front suspension.

Gen 2 

The gen 2 arrived in 2015 and featured a twin spark engine. It also received a redesigned headlight and radiator vents. The two main variants remained ''dark'' and ''carbon''.

Special Editions / Rare Variants

AMG Edition 
Based on the gen 1 carbon platform and released in 2012 the AMG edition has a striking, individual wheel design and redesigned radiator vents to go with its white striped paint job and ribbed seat. The engine is also tuned with handset cam timing and a new exhaust.

Diavel Chromo 
A 2013 variant based on the Gen 1 dark platform, this bike features a chrome tank with classic Ducati logo, silver lower headlight shroud and gloss black seat cowling.

Titanium Edition 
Introduced in 2015, a limited run of 500 bikes based on the Gen 2 platform. The titanium has unique carbon intake ducts, wheels, fuel tank, headlight cowl, windscreen, seat, and seat cowling.

Diesel Edition 
Limited run of 666 bikes based on the Gen 2 platform and released in 2017. The Diavel Diesel is made unique by details in hand-brushed steel with visible welds and rivets, like the tank cover, the headlight fairing and the passenger seat cover. The visible welds also appear on the anodised black side conveyors with a red methacrylate centre cover bearing an embedded Diesel logo. The red colour is also found on the LCD instrument panel, the front brake callipers and five chain links. The pipes of the exhaust system feature a Zircotec black ceramic coating. The silencers with billet endcaps are also black.

Xdiavel 
In 2016, Ducati launched the Xdiavel (available in regular and S versions). With a feet-forward riding position, it was the first Ducati to use a belt final-drive. At the time of its launch, the Xdiavel was Ducati's fastest accelerating (0-60 mph) motorcycle – due to the low profile, long wheelbase, and max power low in the powerband. The 2019 Ducati XDiavel S was reported to have a 0-60 time of 2.9 seconds.  The 1262cc engine produced 93 lb-ft (126 Nm) of torque at 5000 rpm, and 152 hp (112 kW) of power at 9500 rpm.

Diavel 1260 
In 2019, Ducati launched the Diavel 1260 available in regular and S versions. Among other updates, the new Diavel 1260 uses the Testastretta DVT 1262 engine, a new exhaust, reduced rake, and a 63 inch wheelbase.  Cycle World dyno testing found the Diavel 1260 to have 138hp and 85lb-ft of torque.  The base Diavel 1260 was offered only in black and the S version offered only in red with white graphics.

See also
List of fastest production motorcycles
List of fastest production motorcycles by acceleration

References

Diavel
Cruiser motorcycles
Motorcycles introduced in 2011